Sabana Llana Norte is one of the 18 barrios in the municipality of San Juan, Puerto Rico.

Demographics
In 2010, Sabana Llana Norte had a population of 30,118.

Location
Sabana Llana Norte is located east of Oriente barrio, north of the municipality of Trujillo Alto and west of the municipality of Carolina. It is bordered by the San José Lagoon on top, its closest body of water.

Territories
Sabana Llana has the following features: 
  Population: ~32,000 - Land Area:  - Total Area:

Gallery

See also
 List of communities in Puerto Rico

References

Río Piedras, Puerto Rico
Barrios of San Juan, Puerto Rico